Base (stylized as BASE) is the third largest of Belgium's three mobile telecommunications operators. It is a subsidiary of Telenet. It competes with Proximus and Orange Belgium. It was previously owned by KPN and sold to Telenet in 2015.

History
Base was founded as Belgium's third major mobile network operator in 1999 under the brand name of KPN Orange. It was a joint venture between the Dutch KPN Mobile and the then British Orange telcos. After the acquisition of Orange by France Télécom, its shares were sold to KPN Mobile. In 2002, the brand name was changed from Orange to Base.

The fixed line and broadband operations were started in 2007 after the acquisition of Tele2 Belgium. In October 2009 the fixed line and broadband ADSL operations were rebranded from Tele2 to Base.

In 2007, Base purchased the Belgian telecommunications retail store Allo Telecom, which merged with Base in 2014.

In April 2015, news got out that Base is being bought by Telenet for 1,325 billion euros, which will give Telenet access to a mobile network.

Base has an estimated 98% coverage of the country and 26% market share in mobile communications.

Technical information
The operator's display logo is BASE, the net code is 206 20 and operates under 900/1800 MHz GSM, 900/2100 MHz UMTS, 800/1800/2600 MHz LTE.

References

External links
 

Belgian brands
Mobile phone companies of Belgium
KPN